The Mutual Legal Assistance in Criminal Matters Act (the Act) is an act of the Parliament of Canada and initially was passed by the 33rd Canadian Parliament in 1988. It deals with formalities about arrest warrants, production orders and orders of restraint, search and seizure, and forfeiture of assets between Canada and other countries. As of September 2019, well over 50 entries were found in the Canada Treaty Series.

Cases
 United States v. Stumbo, was a US Federal Court case in the Eastern District of California in which the 23 year old defendant, Tyler Stumbo, was convicted of conspiracy to distribute anabolic steroids, which were at the time a Class III prohibited substance. Stumbo was convicted with the aid of a production order served at the British Columbia premises of his ISP, who provided him with encrypted email services.

 Krishnan Suthanthiran was the subject of Belgian prosecutorial attention in 2018, as it seemed to them he had engaged in "possible misuse of company assets, concealing assets in insolvency and money laundering" in his purchase and subsequent bankruptcy of a nuclear medicine business from a Belgian company named Nordion. In 2014, the Belgian authorities invoked the Act, in order to obtain search warrants. He contended that his cyclotron technology was the target of a legal fishing expedition. He was subject to search warrants in two different jurisdictions. A court in British Columbia endorsed his vision, while an Ontario court found in favour of the authorities. He appealed an adverse judgment in the Ontario Court of Appeal to the Supreme Court of Canada where his leave to appeal was denied in January 2018.

References

External links
 

 MLAT
1988 in Canadian law
Canadian federal legislation